The 2019 Vuelta a España is the 74th edition of the Vuelta a España, one of cycling's Grand Tours. The Vuelta started in Torrevieja, with a team time trial on 24 August, and Stage 11 occurred on 4 September with a stage to Urdax. The race finished in Madrid on 15 September.

Classification standings

Stage 1
24 August 2019 —  to Torrevieja, team time trial (TTT)

Stage 2
25 August 2019 — Benidorm to Calpe,

Stage 3
26 August 2019 — Ibi to Alicante,

Stage 4
27 August 2019 — Cullera to El Puig,

Stage 5

Stage 6
29 August 2019 — Mora de Rubielos to Ares del Maestrat,

Stage 7
30 August 2019 — Onda to Mas de la Costa,

Stage 8
31 August 2019 — Valls to Igualada,

Stage 9
1 September 2019 — Andorra la Vella (Andorra) to Encamp (Andorra),

Rest day 1
2 September 2019 — Andorra

Stage 10
3 September 2019 — Jurançon (France) to Pau (France),  (ITT)

Stage 11
4 September 2019 — Saint-Palais (France) to Urdax,

References

Sources

 

2019 Vuelta a España
Vuelta a España stages